CES may stand for:
Closed ecological system, isolated from the outside
Clean Energy Standards
Constant elasticity of substitution, in economics, a feature of a particular class of production function 
The ISO 639 code for the Czech language

Technology
Consumer Electronics Show, annual trade show, Las Vegas, Nevada, US
Circuit Emulation Service, a telecommunication technology
Cryogenic energy storage
Character encoding scheme, a reversible transformation of sequences of code units to sequences of bytes

Companies
 ICAO Code designator for China Eastern Airlines

Medicine
Cauda equina syndrome, a serious neurological condition
Cranial electrotherapy stimulation, therapeutic brain stimulation
Camurati-Engelmann disease, also called "Camurati Engelmann syndrome" (CES)
Carboxylesterase, an enzyme that catalyzes the reaction between a carboxylic ester and water

Organization
Caspian Engineers Society
Center for Economic Studies, University of Munich
Center for Ethical Solutions
Centre for Environmental Studies, former UK research organization
Church Educational System, of The Church of Jesus Christ of Latter-day Saints
Coalition for Economic Survival, a Los Angeles-based community organization
Coalition of Essential Schools, US educational reform
Community Exchange System, international Internet trading network
Commonwealth Employment Service, former Australian Government employment agency
Confédération Européenne de Scoutisme or Confederation of European Scouts
Centre for European Studies (disambiguation), the name of several educational institutions
Center for Election Science, a US-based Approval voting advocacy organization

People
Jean Ces, French boxer of the 1920s

Transportation
Central South station, a proposed MTR station in Hong Kong
Cessnock Airport, IATA airport code "CES"